Jeff Wayne's Musical Version of Spartacus is a 1992 concept album produced and composed by Jeff Wayne with Lyrics by Gary Osborne, telling the story of Roman gladiator, Spartacus.

It starred Anthony Hopkins, Catherine Zeta-Jones (in her first recording role), Fish, Ladysmith Black Mambazo, and Scots singer Alan King as Spartacus.

It was also the first Jeff Wayne release that is not related to his musical adaptation of The War of the Worlds. Based on a story outline by Jeff Wayne, the script was written by writer Brian Sibley and playwright John Spurling with Sibley responsible for the script of 'Animal & Man', 'The Eagle & the Hawk' and 'The Appian Way' and Spurling largely responsible for the script of 'The Parting of the Ways' and 'The Last Battle'. Also starring in the album is Chris Thompson and Jo Partridge, who appeared in The War of the Worlds. Originally, Thompson had a singing role, but his song was dropped from the final version of the album. It is rumoured that Thompson possesses the only copy of his song.
The lead vocals representing Spartacus himself were performed by Scottish vocalist, Alan King of Walk On Fire fame.

The artists for the album were Gino D'Achille, Christos Achilleos and Andrew Wheatcroft, art directed by Richard Evans

Track listing
Disc 1: "Animal & Man"
 Destiny - [Jeff Wayne/Gary Osborne]
 Animal & Man (Part 1) - [Jeff Wayne]
 Animal & Man (Part 2) - [Jeff Wayne]
 For All Time - [Jeff Wayne/James Cassidy]
 Whispers - [Jeff Wayne/Gary Osborne]
 The Eagle & The Hawk - [Jeff Wayne/Gary Osborne]

Disc 2: "The Parting Of The Ways"
 Going Home - [Jeff Wayne/Gary Osborne]
 The Parting Of The Ways - [Jeff Wayne/Gary Osborne]
 We Carry On - [Jeff Wayne/Gary Osborne]
 Trust Me - [Jeff Wayne/Gary Osborne]
 Two Souls With A Single Dream - [Jeff Wayne/Gary Osborne]
 The Last Battle / The Eagle & The Hawk - [Jeff Wayne/Gary Osborne]
 The Appian Way - [Jeff Wayne]
 Epilogue (Part 1) - [Jeff Wayne]
 Epilogue (Part 2) - [Jeff Wayne]

Total Running Time: Approx 111 Minutes'''

Cast
Anthony Hopkins - Marcus Crassus
Catherine Zeta-Jones - Palene
Alan King - Spartacus
Fish - Crixus
Ladysmith Black Mambazo - Spartacus' Army
Chris Thompson - Oenomaus
Jimmy Helms - Isauricus the Sicilian Pirate
Bill Fredericks - Lead Vocals (Going Home)
 Lorna Bannon and Carol Kenyan - Slave Girls

Charts

References

Concept albums
1992 albums
Spartacus
Columbia Records albums
Depictions of Spartacus in music
Cultural depictions of Spartacus
Cultural depictions of Marcus Licinius Crassus